Semen Datsenko (born 10 May 1994 in Poltava, Poltava Oblast, Ukraine) is a professional Ukrainian football defender who plays for FC Trostianets.

Career
Datsenko attended the Sportive youth school of FC Metalist Kharkiv. He made his debut for SC Tavriya Simferopol played in the main-squad team against FC Volyn Lutsk on 21 July 2013 in Ukrainian Premier League.

References

External links
 
 

1994 births
Maltese Premier League players
Living people
Sportspeople from Poltava
Ukrainian footballers
Ukrainian Premier League players
Armenian Premier League players
FC Oleksandriya players
SC Tavriya Simferopol players
FC Mariupol players
FC Metalist Kharkiv players
FC Inhulets Petrove players
FC Shirak players
Mosta F.C. players
FC Lviv players
FC Podillya Khmelnytskyi players
FC Nyva Ternopil players
FC Trostianets players
FC Bukovyna Chernivtsi players
Ukrainian expatriate footballers
Expatriate footballers in Armenia
Ukrainian expatriate sportspeople in Armenia
Expatriate footballers in Malta
Ukrainian expatriate sportspeople in Malta
Association football defenders